Prince Edward, Duke of Kent,  (Edward George Nicholas Paul Patrick; born 9 October 1935) is a member of the British royal family. Queen Elizabeth II and Edward were first cousins through their fathers, King George VI, and Prince George, Duke of Kent. Edward's mother Princess Marina of Greece and Denmark was also a first cousin of the Queen's husband Prince Philip, Duke of Edinburgh, making him both a second cousin and first cousin once removed to King Charles III. He is currently 40th in the line of succession to the British throne.

Prince Edward has held the title of Duke of Kent for more than 80 years, since the age of six, after the death of his father in a plane crash in 1942. Edward carried out engagements on behalf of Elizabeth II and is involved with over 140 charitable organisations. He was president of the All England Lawn Tennis and Croquet Club, presenting the trophies to the Wimbledon champion and runner-up, and served as the United Kingdom's Special Representative for International Trade and Investment, retiring in 2001. He is president of The Scout Association, the Royal United Services Institute, and the Royal Institution of Great Britain, and since 1967 Grand Master of the United Grand Lodge of England. Much of his charity work revolves around war remembrance, technology, and the growth of British industry. He is also the last surviving descendant of George V born during his lifetime.

Early life and education
Prince Edward was born on 9 October 1935, at No. 3 Belgrave Square, London, to the Duke and Duchess of Kent. Home Secretary Sir John Simon was present to verify the birth. His father was the fourth son of King George V and Queen Mary. His mother was the daughter of Prince Nicholas of Greece and Denmark and Grand Duchess Elena Vladimirovna of Russia. He was baptised in the Private Chapel of Buckingham Palace on 20 November 1935 by Archbishop of Canterbury Cosmo Lang. His godparents were his grandparents, King George V, Queen Mary and Prince Nicholas of Greece and Denmark; as well as the Prince of Wales; the Princess Royal, the Duke of Connaught and Strathearn (whose son, Prince Arthur of Connaught, stood proxy); and the Duchess of Argyll.

Prince Edward began his education at Ludgrove, a preparatory school in Berkshire, before going on to Eton College and then Le Rosey in Switzerland. After school he entered the Royal Military Academy Sandhurst, where he won the Sir James Moncrieff Grierson prize for foreign languages. Edward speaks fluent French, having been raised in a house where, according to the words of his younger brother, Prince Michael of Kent, his mother and aunts spoke French as a matter of preference.

On 25 August 1942, Prince Edward's father, the Duke of Kent, was killed when his plane crashed in bad weather in Caithness. Prince Edward, at six years old, succeeded his father as Duke of Kent, Earl of St Andrews and Baron Downpatrick. As a member of the royal family, Prince Edward began performing engagements at an early age. In 1952, at the age of 16, he walked behind the coffin of his uncle, George VI, at his state funeral. In 1953, he attended the coronation of his cousin, Elizabeth II, and was the third to pay homage at her throne, following the dukes of Edinburgh and Gloucester.

Military service
On 29 July 1955, the Duke of Kent graduated from the Royal Military Academy Sandhurst as a second lieutenant in the Royal Scots Greys, the beginning of a military career which lasted over 20 years. He was promoted to captain on 29 July 1961.

From 1962 to 1963, the Duke of Kent served in Hong Kong, later serving on the staff in Eastern Command. He was promoted to major on 31 December 1967. In 1970, the Duke commanded a squadron of his regiment serving in the British Sovereign Base Area in Cyprus, part of the UN force enforcing peace between the Greek and Turkish parts of the divided island. During the early 1970s, the Duke also served in Northern Ireland with his regiment.  He was promoted to lieutenant-colonel on 30 June 1973.

The Duke retired from the army on 15 April 1976. He was subsequently promoted to major-general on 11 June 1983 and to field marshal on 11 June 1993.

A new book about the Queen has revealed that, in 1971, the monarch intervened to prevent the kidnapping of her cousin, the Duke of Kent. The then 35-year-old Duke, an Army officer with the Royal Scots Greys, was sent to Northern Ireland with his unit but the Queen alerted Edward Heath, the prime minister, during her private audience, and he relayed a warning to his ministers. Commanding officers were told the Duke was not to be sent to Belfast without special orders. A few weeks later, he was posted back to the mainland.

Marriage and personal life

At York Minster on 8 June 1961 the Duke of Kent married Katharine Worsley, the only daughter of Sir William Worsley, 4th Baronet, by his wife Joyce Morgan Brunner. She converted to Catholicism in 1994, but because the conversion occurred after their marriage, it did not cause the Duke to lose his place in the line of succession, as the Act of Settlement 1701 only applied where the spouse was a Catholic at the time of marriage. The disqualification by marrying a Catholic was removed by the Succession to the Crown Act 2013. 

The couple have three living children:

 George, Earl of St Andrews, born 26 June 1962 at Coppins; married Sylvana Tomaselli
 Lady Helen Taylor, born 28 April 1964 at Coppins; married Timothy Taylor
 Lord Nicholas Windsor, born 25 July 1970 at King's College Hospital in London; married, 2006, Paola Doimi de Lupis de Frankopan

Katharine had an abortion in 1975 owing to rubella and gave birth to a stillborn son, Patrick, in 1977. 

The Duke and Duchess of Kent reside at Wren House, Kensington Palace, in London.

In 2011, close associates of Jonathan Rees, a private investigator connected to the News International phone hacking scandal, stated that he had penetrated Edward and Katharine's bank accounts.

The Duke had a mild stroke on the morning of 18 March 2013. In April 2015, he suffered from a hip injury and was hospitalised at Aberdeen Royal Infirmary for further treatments.

Activities

The Duke of Kent performed engagements on behalf of his cousin, the Queen, for over 50 years. The Duke represented the Queen during independence celebrations in the Commonwealth countries of Sierra Leone, Uganda, Guyana, Gambia Ghana, to commemorate its 50th independence anniversary celebration. He also acted as Counsellor of State during periods of the Queen's absence abroad.

One of the Duke's major public roles for many years was vice-chairman of British Trade International, formerly known as the British Overseas Trade Board, and later as the United Kingdom's Special Representative for International Trade and Investment. This position saw the Duke travel abroad to represent the British government in fostering trade relations with foreign countries and organisations. Prince Andrew, Duke of York succeeded him in this position, which is today known as UK Trade & Investment (or UKTI), although Prince Andrew resigned from the post in 2011. He was also the vice-chairman of the British Overseas Trade Board. In that capacity, he became the first member of the royal family to visit China in 1979 with his focus being on the British Energy Exhibition in Beijing.

From 1971 to 2000, the Duke of Kent was president of English football's governing body, The Football Association. The Duke has served as the president of The Scout Association since 1975. 
Along with Prince William of Wales, the Duke visited the Centenary World Scout Jamboree at Hylands Park, Chelmsford in July 2007. He also served as the president of the All England Lawn Tennis and Croquet Club between 1969 and 2021, a position in which he succeeded his late mother, Princess Marina, Duchess of Kent. His other roles include president of the Commonwealth War Graves Commission, the RAF Benevolent Fund, the Royal National Lifeboat Institution, the Stroke Association, the Royal United Services Institute, the Royal Institution, the British Racing Drivers' Club, and patron of the American Air Museum in Britain, Royal West Norfolk Golf Club, Kent County Cricket Club, Opera North, Trinity Laban Conservatoire of Music and Dance, the Duke of York's Royal Military School Dover and St Mungo's Broadway, benefiting the homeless. He is also on the advisory panel for the Mountbatten Medal and presents the medal once the decision has been made. The Duke of Kent is one of the Royal Fellows of the Royal Academy of Engineering.

For almost 29 years, the Duke has been the patron of Endeavour, a national youth organisation. He has also served as Royal Patron of The Honourable Society of Lincoln's Inn since 2001, a position previously occupied by his father. In 2015, the Duke received the Dresden Peace Prize for "his contribution to British-German reconciliation."

On 2 June 2022, the Duke appeared alongside the Queen on the balcony of Buckingham Palace during the 2022 Trooping the Colour as part of the Platinum Jubilee celebrations.

Freemasonry
The Duke was initiated into Royal Alpha Lodge No. 16 on 16 December 1963, and was elected its Worshipful Master for 1965 and 1966.

Having been appointed Senior Grand Warden in 1966, he was elected as Grand Master the following year, and was installed on 14 June 1967 during United Grand Lodge of England's 250th anniversary celebrations at the Royal Albert Hall. He is the 10th, and longest-serving Grand Master of UGLE, the governing body of Freemasonry in England and Wales.

In December 2013, he celebrated 50 years as a freemason. In October 2017 he presided over the tercentenary celebrations of UGLE, marking the 300th anniversary of the founding of the original Grand Lodge, one of two which merged to form UGLE in 1813. The main ceremony was held in the Royal Albert Hall, in the year which also marked the Duke's 50th anniversary of installation as Grand Master.

Titles, styles, honours and arms

Titles and styles
 9 October 1935 – 25 August 1942: His Royal Highness Prince Edward of Kent
 25 August 1942 – present: His Royal Highness The Duke of Kent

Military ranks
 29 July 1955: Second lieutenant, Royal Scots Greys
 29 July 1957: Lieutenant, Royal Scots Greys
 29 July 1961: Captain, Royal Scots Greys
 31 December 1967: Major, Royal Scots Greys
 30 June 1973: Lieutenant-colonel, Royal Scots Dragoon Guards. Retired on 15 April 1976
 11 June 1983: Major general
 11 June 1993: Field marshal

Honours

  12 May 1937: King George VI Coronation Medal
  2 June 1953: Queen Elizabeth II Coronation Medal
  1960: Knight Grand Cross of the Royal Victorian Order (GCVO)
  1961: Sierra Leone Independence Medal
  1966: Guyana Independence Medal
  Knight Grand Cross of the Order of St Michael and St George (GCMG)
 1967: Principal Knight Grand Cross of the Order of St Michael and St George
  6 February 1977: Queen Elizabeth II Silver Jubilee Medal
  1985: Royal Knight of the Order of the Garter (KG)
  6 February 2002: Queen Elizabeth II Golden Jubilee Medal
  6 February 2012: Queen Elizabeth II Diamond Jubilee Medal
  Army Long Service and Good Conduct Medal with 3 Bars
  Canadian Forces' Decoration (with three clasps) (CD)
  6 February 2022: Queen Elizabeth II Platinum Jubilee Medal

Foreign
  1970: United Nations Medal for the UNFICYP mission
 1992: Golden Pheasant Award of the Scout Association of Japan
 6 November 2000: Knight of the Order of Charles XIII
: Order of Saints George and Constantine First class (civil division)
: Grand Cordon of the Supreme Order of the Renaissance (special class)
: Grand Cordon of the Order of the Star of Jordan
: Grand Cross of the Order of the Star of Africa
: Order of the Three Divine Powers First Class (Jyotirmaya-Subikhyat-Tri-Shakti-Patta)
 1988: Grand Cross of the Order of St Olav
: Grand Cross of the Order of Merit of the Republic of Poland
 21 May 2015: Order of Merit of the Free State of Saxony

Civilian appointments
  Personal Aide-de-Camp to the Sovereign (1 August 1966 to date)
  University of Surrey, chancellor (June 1976 to date)
 Royal Fellow of the Royal Society (FRS) (1990 to date)

Military appointments

 Canada
  11 June 1977: Colonel-in-Chief, of The Lorne Scots (Peel, Dufferin and Halton Regiment)

 United Kingdom
  Colonel, of the Scots Guards
  Colonel-in-Chief, of the Royal Regiment of Fusiliers
  Royal Colonel, 1st Battalion, of The Rifles
  Deputy Colonel-in-Chief, of the Royal Scots Dragoon Guards
  1993: Honorary Air Commodore, of the RAF Leuchars
  15 June 1985 – 30 June 1996: Honorary Air Vice Marshal RAF
  1 July 1996: Honorary Air Chief Marshal RAF

Arms

Issue

Ancestry

Bibliography

Books

Authored articles and letters

Notes

References

External links

The Duke of Kent at the Royal Family website

The United Grand Lodge of England – HRH The Duke of Kent, KG, GCMG, GCVO, ADC (Grand Master)
Time Article on Birth of Prince Edward

1935 births
Living people
Alumni of Institut Le Rosey
British field marshals
British people of Greek descent
British princes
British royal memoirists
Dukes of Kent
Graduates of the Royal Military Academy Sandhurst
Grand Commanders of the Order of Saints George and Constantine
Grand Crosses of the Order of Merit of the Republic of Poland
Grand Masters of the United Grand Lodge of England
Kent
Knights Grand Cross of the Order of St Michael and St George
Knights Grand Cross of the Royal Victorian Order
Knights of the Garter
Knights of the Order of Charles XIII
Edward, Duke of Kent
Members of the Order of Tri Shakti Patta, First Class
Recipients of the Order of Merit of the Free State of Saxony
People associated with the University of Surrey
People educated at Eton College
People educated at Ludgrove School
People from Westminster
Presidents of the British Computer Society
Presidents of the British Science Association
Presidents of the Football Association
Edward, Duke of Kent
Royal Air Force air marshals
Royal Scots Greys officers
Royal Scots Dragoon Guards officers